Chestnut is a hair coat color of horses consisting of a reddish-to-brown coat with a mane and tail the same or lighter in color than the coat. Chestnut is characterized by the absolute absence of true black hairs.  It is one of the most common horse coat colors, seen in almost every breed of horse.

Chestnut is a very common coat color but the wide range of shades can cause confusion. The lightest chestnuts may be mistaken for palominos, while the darkest shades can be so dark they appear black. Chestnuts have dark brown eyes and black skin, and typically are some shade of red or reddish brown. The mane, tail, and legs may be lighter or darker than the body coat, but unlike the bay they are never truly black. Like any other color of horse, chestnuts may have pink skin with white hair where there are white markings, and if such white markings include one or both eyes, the eyes may be blue. Chestnut foals may be born with pinkish skin, which darkens shortly afterwards.

Chestnut is produced by a recessive gene.  Unlike many coat colors, chestnut can be true-breeding; that is, assuming they carry no recessive modifiers like pearl or  mushroom, the mating between two chestnuts will produce chestnut offspring every time. This can be seen in breeds such as the Suffolk Punch and Haflinger, which are exclusively chestnut. Other breeds including the American Belgian Draft and Budyonny are predominantly chestnut. However, a chestnut horse need not have two chestnut parents. This is especially apparent in breeds like the Friesian horse and Ariegeois pony which have been selected for many years to be uniformly black, but on rare occasions still produce chestnut foals.

Visual identification

Chestnuts can vary widely in shade and different terms are sometimes used to describe these shades, even though they are genetically indistinguishable. Collectively, these coat colors are usually called "red" by geneticists.

A basic chestnut or "red" horse has a solid copper-reddish coat, with a mane and tail that is close to the same shade as the body coat.
 Sorrel is a term used by American stock horse registries to describe red horses with manes and tails the same shade or lighter than the body coat color. In these registries, chestnut describes the darker shades of red-based coats. Colloquially, in the American west, almost all copper-red chestnuts are called "sorrel." In other parts of the English-speaking world, some consider a "sorrel" to be a light chestnut with a flaxen mane and tail.

 Liver chestnut or dark chestnut are not a separate genetic color, but a descriptive term. The genetic controls for the depth of shade are not presently understood. Liver chestnuts are a very dark-reddish brown. Liver chestnuts are included in the term "dark chestnut." The darkest chestnuts, particularly common in the Morgan horse, may be indistinguishable from true black without very careful inspection. Often confusingly called "black chestnuts," they may be identified by small amounts of reddish hair on the lower legs, mane and tail, or by DNA or pedigree testing. Recently, it has been suggested that the trait or traits that produce certain darker shades of chestnut and bay, referred to as "sooty" coloration follow a recessive mode of inheritance.
 Flaxen chestnut and blond chestnut are terms that describe manes and/or tails that are flaxen, or significantly lighter than the body color. Sometimes this difference is only a shade or two, but other flaxen chestnuts have near-white or silverish manes and tails. Haflingers are exclusively of this shade.  It is considered desirable in other breeds, though the genetic mechanism is not fully understood. Some flaxen chestnuts can be mistaken for palominos and have been registered in palomino color registries.

 Pangaré or mealy is thought to be controlled by a single gene, unrelated to chestnut color, and produces distinct characteristics common to wild equids: pale hairs around the eyes and muzzle and a pale underside. Haflingers and Belgians are examples of mealy chestnuts. The flaxen characteristic is sometimes associated with pangaré.

Chestnut family colors
Chestnut is considered a "base color" in the discussion of equine coat color genetics. Additional coat colors based on chestnut are often described in terms of their relationship to chestnut:
 Palominos have a chestnut base coat color that is genetically modified to a golden shade by a single copy of the incomplete dominant cream gene.  Palominos can be distinguished from chestnuts by the lack of true red tones in the coat; even the palest chestnuts have slight red tints to their hair rather than gold. The eyes of chestnuts are usually dark brown, while those of a palomino are sometimes a slightly lighter amber. Some color breed registries that promote palomino coloring have accepted flaxen chestnuts because registration is based on a physical description rather than a genetic identity.
 Cremellos have a chestnut base coat and homozygous (two copies) for the cream gene.  They have a cream-colored coat, blue eyes and lightly pigmented pink skin.

 Red duns have a chestnut base coat with the dun gene (one or two copies). Their body color is pale, dusty tan shade that resembles the light undercoat color of a body-clipped chestnut but with a bold, dark dorsal stripe in dark red, a red mane, tail and legs. They may have additional primitive markings, which distinguish a red dun from a light or body-clipped chestnut.
 Gold champagnes have a chestnut base coat with the champagne gene (one or two copies). They resemble a palomino, or they may be an all-over apricot shade, but can be distinguished from other colors by amber or green eyes and lightened skin color with freckling.
 Red or "strawberry" roans have a chestnut base coat with the classic roan gene (one or two copies).
 A skewbald, "chestnut pinto" or "sorrel Paint"  is a pinto horse with chestnut and white patches.

Combinations of multiple dilution genes do not always have consistent names. For example, "dunalinos" are chestnuts with both the dun gene and one copy of the cream gene.

Chestnut mimics

 Bay horses also have reddish coats, but they have a black mane, tail, legs and other point coloration. The presence of true black points, even if obscured by white markings, means that a horse is not chestnut.
 Seal brown or dark bay horses are not chestnut but may be confused with a liver chestnut. Those unfamiliar with horse coat color terminology often call most horses "brown". including chestnuts. Brown, which may be difficult to distinguish visually from dark bay, is always accompanied by black points. Liver chestnuts, in particular, are mistakenly called brown or "seal brown".
 Silver bay horses typically have chocolate- to red-brown bodies with silvered mane, tail, and legs. The flat reddish-brown color and lack of easily identified black points can confuse even  knowledgeable horse persons. Silver dapple horses usually hint at black or dark gray pigment at the roots of the mane and tail, and where their silver points end on the legs. Silvers look a bit "off"-chestnut.  To further confuse matters, some flaxen chestnuts have silverish streaks in their manes and tails. However, genetic testing can clarify matters.

Inheritance and expression

The chestnut color, called "red" by geneticists, is created by an allele that is a mutation from the wildtype and is genetically the most recessive coat color that exists in modern horses.  The gene for "red" color is designated as "e".  This is because the presence or absence of red color in horses is determined by the equine melanocortin 1 receptor (MC1R), a protein positioned on chromosome 3 (ECA3) at the Extension locus.  The wild type version of the gene encoding MC1R is the E allele (colloquially, though imprecisely, called the "Extension gene"), and is part of the genetic pathway that allows melanocytes to produce eumelanin, or black pigment.  When the "E" allele is not present, no eumelanin is produced, but the "e" allele still allows melanin to be produced in the form of  pheomelanin, or red pigment, creating a chestnut or red-based coat color.  In general, alleles that create fully functional MC1R proteins are inherited dominantly and result in a black-based coat color ("E"), while mutated alleles that create "dysfunctional" MC1R are recessive and result in a lighter coat color ("e").

Red hair color in horses ("e") is created by a missense mutation in the code for MC1R, which  results in a protein that cannot bind to the Melanocyte-stimulating hormone (MSH), which is released by the pituitary gland, and stimulates the production and release of melanin in skin and hair.  So long as one functional copy ("E") is present, the protein is formed normally and black pigment is produced. However, when only mutant copies ("e) of the gene are available, non-functional MC1R proteins are produced. As a result, no black pigment is deposited into the hair and the entire coat is red-based. However, the skin of chestnut horses is still  generally black, unless affected by other genes.   Some chestnut foals are also born with lighter eyes and lightened skin, which darken not long after birth. This is not the same as the blue eyes and pink skin seen at birth in foals carrying the champagne gene.  It is a genetic mechanism not fully understood, but may be related to the pheomelanistic characteristics of "e".

The recessive nature of the chestnut or "red" coat in horses occurs because a single copy of the E allele is dominant over the e allele.  Therefore, for example, bay and black horses may be heterozygous for e and if so, could produce a chestnut foal when bred to another horse with at least one copy of "e".  However, all chestnut horses are homozygous for the "e" allele and thus breeding a chestnut to another chestnut will always produce a chestnut foal.  Thus, unlike many coat colors, chestnut can be true-breeding; if any color other than chestnut occurs, then one of the parents was not chestnut.

Red can occur in horses that carry "E" when other genes influence its expression.  In some cases, MC1R exists but is locally antagonized by the agouti signalling peptide (ASIP), or "agouti gene", which "suppresses" black color and allows some red pigment to be formed. This results in localized regions of black-rich or red-rich pigmentation, as seen in bay horses.

See also

Equine coat color
Equine coat color genetics

References

 "Horse coat color tests" from the UC Davis Veterinary Genetics Lab
"Introduction to Coat Color Genetics" from Veterinary Genetics Laboratory, School of Veterinary Medicine, University of California, Davis.  Web Site accessed January 12, 2008

External links
 Chestnut Horse Genetics, Information, & Photos

Horse coat colors